The 1939 World Table Tennis Championships women's singles was the 13th edition of the women's singles championship.
Vlasta Depetrisová defeated Gertrude Pritzi in the final by three sets to two, to win the title. The tournament suffered from lack of entries due to the troubles in Europe and the forthcoming World War II. Only 11 men's teams and 5 women's teams entered the Championships. Hungary, the United States and Austria were the major nations missing.

After the annexation of Austria by Germany, the Austrian Pritzi had to participate under the Nazi Germany flag.

Results

+ withdrew

See also
List of World Table Tennis Championships medalists

References

-
-